Cadallaca is an indie rock band formed at a party in Portland, Oregon in 1997. The group consists of Corin Tucker of Sleater-Kinney (vocals and guitar), Sarah Dougher of The Lookers (vocals and Farfisa organ), and sts, also of the Lookers (drums). The three women in the band have adopted the nicknames Kissy, Dusty, and Junior. The band is often described as being an old-fashioned girl group, in the tradition of such acts as the Shangri-Las, with a feminist rhetoric.

Cadallaca has released two releases (one album and one EP) as of 2012. The first, Introducing Cadallaca, was released by K Records in 1998. Their second release, an EP titled Out West, was released in 1999 by Kill Rock Stars. Songs from these albums have also been featured on two Kill Rock Stars compilations.

References

External links
Cadallaca fansite, with pics, discography, etc.
Kill Rock Stars factsheet about the band

Musical groups established in 1997
All-female bands
K Records artists
Kill Rock Stars
Musical groups from Portland, Oregon
Riot grrrl bands
1997 establishments in Oregon